The Dazzling Miss Davison is a lost 1917 silent film drama directed by Frank Powell and starring Marjorie Rambeau based on the 1910 book of the same name by Florence Warden. Powell produced the feature and released it through the Mutual Film Company.

Cast

Plot 
When Gerard Buckland sees a dishonest-looking fellow hand a diamond necklace to a beautiful young woman in a crowd, he is shocked by what he witnesses. Later when visiting the home of his friend, Arthur Jennings, he is astonished to see the young woman there. Miss Davison, unaware that she has been observed earlier, tells Gerald that she has a gift for picking pockets, but only as a party trick. Gerard doesn't know what to believe, but determines to find out the truth. When Gerald follows her to the country home of the Van Santens, an American family who like to gamble, he discovers more than he bargained for.

Reception 
According to the Montrose, Arbroath and Brechin review; and Forfar and Kincardineshire advertiser:Few observers of the film will be able until the end to supply the answer to the question in the title, but it is one which explains all that has been puzzling before, and it provides a logical and dramatic finish to the story.

References

External links

1917 films
American silent feature films
Lost American films
Films directed by Frank Powell
American black-and-white films
Silent American drama films
1917 drama films
Lost drama films
1917 lost films
1910s American films
1910s English-language films